Ciera Payton (born January 26, 1986) is an American actress and writer. She has appeared in television series such as The Walking Dead, General Hospital, Graceland, and NCIS. She also had a supporting role as Sylvia in Tyler Perry's A Madea Family Funeral. She currently stars in the BET soap opera The Oval.

Early life 
Ciera Payton graduated from the New Orleans Center for Creative Arts and received her bachelor of fine arts degree in drama from the University of North Carolina School of the Arts.

Career 
Payton got her start in the feature film Flight of Fury (2007), playing the female lead role of CIA agent Jessica opposite Steven Seagal. She was a junior in college while filming Flight of Fury. In 2009, she made her off-Broadway debut, starring as the lead role of Savannah in Savannah Black and Blue, produced by the Negro Ensemble Company.

In 2010, Payton transitioned from New York to Los Angeles where she booked the role of Janet Tanner in the BBC American reboot of Torchwood. She later appeared on The Closer, playing opposite Keira Sedwick as Keisha Murphy. After gaining a few roles on the small screen, Payton was granted the role of Capri in Spike Lee's film Oldboy, sharing the screen with Josh Brolin.

In 2014, she appeared as the cheerleading coach who takes down a prominent campaign in The Runner starring Nicolas Cage.

In 2016, she received the Los Angeles Pioneer Woman Award for her work providing arts programs to at-risk youth.

In 2019, she starred in the film A Madea Family Funeral.

Payton portrayed talk show host Wendy Williams in the 2021 Lifetime biopic Wendy Williams: The Movie.

Filmography

Film

Television

References

External links 

http://www.nocca.com/alum-spotlight-congrats-ciera-payton/
https://web.archive.org/web/20180901015620/http://casaesperanzaihm.org/volunteer.html

1986 births
African-American actresses
Actresses from New Orleans
University of North Carolina School of the Arts alumni
Living people
21st-century African-American people
21st-century African-American women
20th-century African-American people
20th-century African-American women